Shapero is a surname. Notable people with the surname include:

 Harold Shapero (1920–2013), American composer
 Rich Shapero (born 1948), American venture capitalist and author

See also 
 Shapeero
 Shapiro
 Schapiro

Jewish surnames
Yiddish-language surnames